Miss Universe Singapore is a beauty pageant and organization that selects the Singapore official representative to the Miss Universe pageant. The reigning Miss Universe Singapore is Carissa Yap, who was crowned on 17 October 2022, at  Caldwell House, Singapore.

History

Singapore has been sending representatives to Miss Universe contest as early as 1954. The title of the first Miss Singapore ever was won by the Siti Mariam binti Ismail in 1951. The city-state republic has been represented at Miss Universe every year since 1966. The country had its first semi finalist when Kathie Lee Lee Beng secured the eighth position, the highest ever placement Singapore attained when the pageant was held in St. Louis in 1983. In 1987 when Singapore played host to the Miss Universe pageant, home favourite Marion Nicole Teo came in at the ninth place. After 34 years, Singapore secures a place again, with Nandita Banna being a semifinalist in the 70th edition of the Miss Universe pageant held in Port of Eilat, Israel.

Between 2001 and 2007, the contest was telecast 'live' by the local television station Mediacorp's Channel 5. Miss Universe Singapore Organisation holds the license to oversee and produce the Miss Universe Singapore pageant (2015). Prior to 2015, the contest was organised by Derrol Stepenny Promotions. Nuraliza Osman, the 2002 Miss Universe Singapore winner, took over the Miss Universe Singapore's licence and franchise in May 2015 from Derrol Stepenny Promotions.

Titleholders 
The following is a list of all Miss Universe Singapore titleholders, and runners-up.

Titleholders under Miss Universe Singapore organisation

Miss Universe Singapore 

The winner of Miss Singapore represents her country at the Miss Universe. On occasion, when the winner does not qualify (due to age) for either contest, a runner-up is sent.

See also
Mister Singapore
Miss Singapore World
Miss Singapore International
Miss Earth Singapore

References

External links 
 

Singapore
Beauty pageants in Singapore
Recurring events established in 1948
Singaporean awards